EuroAtlantic Airways, legally EuroAtlantic Airways – Transportes Aéreos S.A., is a Portuguese airline specialized in leasing and air charter headquartered in Sintra and based at Lisbon Airport.

History

Founded as Air Zarco on 23 August 1993 by Tomaz Metello, the company adopted the trade name Air Madeira until 17 May 2000, when the memorandum of association was altered by deed, and the name of EuroAtlantic Airways – Transportes Aéreos S.A. was adopted. EuroAtlantic also took over the corporate design from Air Zarco which is still used today. The airline was founded by Portuguese businessman Tomaz Metello, who was the owner of the airline until 2019. It was sold to the Luxembourg group Imperial Jet, led by German-Lebanese pilot and businessman Abed El-Jaouni. EuroAtlantic also owns 38% of the national airline of São Tomé and Príncipe, STP Airways.

EuroAtlantic operated a direct flight from Lisbon to Dili's Presidente Nicolau Lobato International Airport in January 2008 using a Boeing 757-200 carrying 140 members of the Portuguese National Guard. It was the first aircraft larger than a Boeing 737 to ever land at the airport.

EuroAtlantic was known for operating the last Lockheed L-1011 TriStar in passenger service in Europe. It was phased out in March 2010 and is since stored at Amman Civil Airport.

Destinations

Charter and ACMI operations
EuroAtlantic Airways operates worldwide charter services as well as ACMI and other wet lease operations, mostly on behalf of other airlines. For example, EuroAtlantic operated two Boeing 777s on behalf of Biman Bangladesh Airlines in 2009 and two Boeing 767s for Air Canada in 2014. Among their usual customers are TAP Air Portugal, LOT Polish Airlines, FlyNAS (for Hajj flights), TACV Cabo Verde Airlines, and TUI fly Belgium.  The company slogan is Anytime, Anywhere!

Scheduled operations
As of February 2021, EuroAtlantic Airways also serves the following scheduled destinations. This single route had been inaugurated after TAP Air Portugal ceased it for a short period and has been maintained since.

 
 Bissau - Osvaldo Vieira International Airport

 
 Lisbon - Lisbon Airport base

Fleet

Current fleet 
As of December 2022, the EuroAtlantic Airways fleet consists of the following aircraft:

Former fleet 
EuroAtlantic Airways has previously operated the following aircraft:

References

External links

Official website

Airlines established in 1993
Airlines of Portugal
Charter airlines
Companies based in Lisbon
Portuguese brands
Portuguese companies established in 1993